The 2009–10 ACB season was the 27th season of the Liga ACB. The regular season began on Saturday, October 10, 2009, and ended on Sunday, May 16, 2010.

Team Standings

Italics indicate holder of a Euroleague "A License", giving the team automatic access to the 2010–11 Euroleague Regular Season regardless of league placement.

Final standings:
{| class="wikitable" style="text-align: center;"
! # !! Teams !! GP !! W !! L !! PF !! PA
|- bgcolor=7fff00
|1||align="left"|Regal FC Barcelona || 34 || 31 || 3 || 2736 || 2202
|- bgcolor=B0EE90
|2||align="left"|Caja Laboral || 34 || 27 || 7 || 2734 || 2484
|- bgcolor=B0EE90
|3||align="left"|Real Madrid || 34 || 27 || 7 || 2762 || 2442
|- bgcolor=ccccff
|4||align="left"|Power Electronics Valencia || 34 || 23 || 11 || 2637 || 2563
|- bgcolor=B0EE90
|5||align="left"|Unicaja || 34 || 19 || 15 || 2721 || 2545
|- bgcolor=B0EE90
|6||align="left"|Cajasol || 34 || 19 || 15 || 2406 || 2334
|- bgcolor=B0EE90
|7||align="left"|Asefa Estudiantes || 34 || 19 || 15 || 2672 || 2621 
|- bgcolor=B0EE90
|8||align="left"|Gran Canaria 2014 || 34 || 17 || 17 || 2560 || 2544
|-
|9||align="left"|Bizkaia Bilbao Basket || 34 || 16 || 18 || 2538 || 2551
|-
|10||align="left"|CB Granada || 34 || 15 || 19 || 2622 || 2690
|- 
|11||align="left"|DKV Joventut || 34 || 15 || 19 || 2639 || 2712
|-
|12||align="left"|Suzuki Manresa || 34 || 14 || 20 || 2440 || 2563
|-
|13||align="left"|Blancos de Rueda Valladolid || 34 || 13 || 21 || 2484 || 2631
|-
|14||align="left"|Lagun Aro GBC || 34 || 13 || 21 || 2500 || 2667
|-
|15||align="left"|Meridiano Alicante || 34 || 13 || 21 || 2563 || 2696
|-
|16||align="left"|Ayuda en Acción Fuenlabrada || 34 || 12 || 22 || 2549 || 2733
|- bgcolor=FFCCCC
|17||align="left"|Xacobeo Blu:sens || 34 || 8 || 26 || 2520 || 2814
|- bgcolor=FFCCCC
|18||align="left"|CB Murcia || 34 || 5 || 29 || 2499 || 2790
|-

Playoffs

Stats Leaders
Finals Stats 

Points

Rebounds

Assists

Awards

Regular season MVP
 Tiago Splitter – Caja Laboral

All-ACB team

Best CoachXavi Pascual – Regal FC Barcelona

ACB Rising Star AwardRichard Hendrix''' – CB Granada

MVP Week by Week
{| class="wikitable sortable" style="text-align: center;"
! align="center"|Date
! align="center"|Player
! align="center"|Team
! align="center"|Efficiency
|-
|1||align="left"| Esteban Batista||Ayuda en acción Fuenlabrada||31
|-
|2||align="left"| Gerald Fitch||Ayuda en acción Fuenlabrada (2)||37
|-
|3||align="left"| Chris Moss   Chris Thomas||CB Murcia  Ayuda en acción Fuenlabrada (3)||32
|-
|4||align="left"| Gerald Fitch (2)||Ayuda en acción Fuenlabrada (4)||44
|-
|5||align="left"| Rafa Martínez||Power Electronics Valencia||24
|-
|6||align="left"| Mirza Teletović||Caja Laboral||34
|-
|7||align="left"| Román Montañez||Suzuki Manresa||36
|-
|8||align="left"| Novica Veličković||Real Madrid||36
|-
|9||align="left"| Esteban Batista (2)||Ayuda en acción Fuenlabrada (5)||29
|-
|10||align="left"| Rafa Martínez (2)||Power Electronics Valencia (2)||36
|-
|11||align="left"| Marko Banić ||Bizkaia Bilbao Basket || 25
|-
|12||align="left"| Tariq Kirksay ||Cajasol || 30
|-
|13||align="left"| Rafael Hettsheimeir ||Xacobeo Blu:Sens || 35
|-
|14||align="left"| Joe Ingles ||CB Granada || 40
|-
|15||align="left"| Gerald Fitch (3)||Ayuda en acción Fuenlabrada (6)||42
|-
|16||align="left"| Diego García ||Blancos de Rueda Valladolid ||47
|-
|17||align="left"| Clay Tucker ||DKV Joventut ||44
|-
|18||align="left"| Chris Lofton ||Asefa Estudiantes ||28
|-
|19||align="left"| Gerald Fitch (4)||Ayuda en acción Fuenlabrada (7)||30
|-
|20||align="left"| Joe Ingles (2)||CB Granada (2) || 34
|-
|21||align="left"| Nando De Colo  || Power Electronics Valencia (3) || 37
|-
|22||align="left"| Axel Hervelle  || Bizkaia Bilbao Basket (2) || 36
|-
|23||align="left"| Federico Van Lacke  || Blancos de Rueda Valladolid (2) || 33
|-
|24||align="left"| Carlos Suárez  || Asefa Estudiantes (2) || 35
|-
|25||align="left"| Kostas Vasileiadis  || Xacobeo Blu:Sens (2) || 35
|-
|26||align="left"| Esteban Batista (3)||Ayuda en acción Fuenlabrada (8)||33
|-
|27||align="left"| Matt Nielsen  || Power Electronics Valencia (4) || 32
|-
|28||align="left"| Juan Carlos Navarro  || Regal FC Barcelona  || 32
|-
|29||align="left"| Jaycee Carroll  || Gran Canaria 2014  || 31
|-
|30||align="left"| Dusko Savanovic ||Cajasol (2)|| 40
|-
|31||align="left"| Álex Mumbrú  || Bizkaia Bilbao Basket (3) || 37
|-
|32||align="left"| Txemi Urtasun  || Meridiano Alicante  || 26
|-
|33||align="left"| Juanpi Gutiérrez ||CB Granada (3) || 31
|-
|34||align="left"| Milos Vujanic ||CB Murcia (2) || 32

Player of the month 
{| class="wikitable sortable" style="text-align: center;"
! align="center"|Month
! align="center"|Week
! align="center"|Player
! align="center"|Team
! align="center"|Efficiency
!
|-
|October||1–5||align="left"| Gerald Fitch||Ayuda en acción Fuenlabrada||24,2||
|-
|November||6–10||align="left"| Novica Veličković||Real Madrid||19,6||
|-
|December||11–15||align="left"| Clay Tucker||DKV Joventut||22,8||
|-
|January||16–20||align="left"| Federico Van Lacke||Blancos de Rueda Valladolid||22,4||
|-
|February||21–23||align="left"| Omar Cook||Unicaja||20||
|-
|March||24–27||align="left"| Carlos Suárez||Asefa Estudiantes||23,75||
|-
|April||28–31||align="left"| Tiago Splitter || Caja Laboral||27,7||
|-
|May||31–34||align="left"| Nik Caner-Medley || Asefa Estudiantes||22,7||
|-

References

External links
 ACB.com 
 linguasport.com 

 
Liga ACB seasons
 
Spain